Shivajinagar is a city and a majri municipal council in Chandrapur district in the Indian state of Maharashtra.

Demographics
 India census, Shivajinagar had a population of 28,793. Males constitute 53% of the population and females 47%. Shivajinagar has an average literacy rate of 68%, higher than the national average of 59.5%: male literacy is 76% and female literacy is 59%. In Shivajinagar, 14% of the population is under 6 years of age.

References

Cities and towns in Chandrapur district